Carex occidentalis is a species of sedge known by the common name western sedge. It is native to the southwestern United States and parts of the west as far north as Montana. It grows mainly in dry habitat such as woodland and grassland. The plant produces very narrow stems up to about 90 centimeters in maximum height, sometimes with rhizomes. The inflorescence produces a cluster of several rounded flower spikes. The pistillate flowers are covered in scales which are brown with green, three-veined centers.

External links
Jepson Manual Treatment
USDA Plants Profile
Flora of North America
Photo gallery

occidentalis
Plants described in 1889
Taxa named by Liberty Hyde Bailey
Flora of Texas
Flora of Mexico
Flora of New Mexico
Flora of Arizona
Flora of California
Flora of Nevada
Flora of Colorado
Flora of Montana
Flora of Utah
Flora of Wyoming
Flora of North Dakota
Flora of South Dakota